WGBG (1590 AM) was a radio station licensed to serve Ocean City, Maryland, United States. The station was owned by Adams Radio Group, LLC, through licensee Adams Radio of Delmarva Peninsula, LLC. In September 2010, the station began relaying on an FM translator, W286BB on 105.1 MHz, in Ocean Pines, Maryland. On December 23, 2010, the station changed its call letters from WKHZ to WMHZ. On April 21, 2011, the station changed its call letters from WMHZ to WAMS.

On September 15, 2011, WAMS changed their call letters to WQMR and changed their format to talk, branded as "Hot Talk WQMR".

On August 13, 2012, WQMR changed their call letters back to WAMS, and changed their format to oldies.

On October 26, 2012, WAMS changed their format again, this time as adult hits, branded as "JACK FM". The call letters changed to WIJK on November 20, 2012.

On April 6, 2013, WIJK once again changed their format, this time to a sports talk format as an affiliate of CBS Sports Radio. They retained the WIJK call letters they switched to under the Jack FM branding, and became known as "The Jock".

On November 18, 2013, WIJK went silent.

WIJK is back on the air and broadcasting the CBS Sports Radio format. (Date of return to the air uncertain - observed May 2014).

On August 24, 2014, WIJK 1590 AM and W286BB 105.1 FM were acquired by Eastern Shore Media/Bay Broadcasting, Inc, and are in use to bring Bay Country 97.9 (WBEY) programming to the Ocean City, Berlin/Ocean Pines, and Fenwick area.

In January 2015, WIJK changed their format to alternative rock, branded as "105.1 The Ryde" (format moved from WRYD 101.1 FM Snow Hill, Maryland, which flipped to country).

Effective May 21, 2016, Bayshore Media transferred the licenses for WGBG and translators W282AW and W286BB to Adams Radio Group, LLC, in exchange for the licenses for WSUX and translator W242AV. On May 25, 2016, WIJK changed their format to a simulcast of classic rock-formatted WGBG 98.5 FM. On June 7, 2016, WIJK changed their call letters to WGBG. On December 12, 2016 WGBG went silent.

In January 2017, the station returned to the air, simulcasting WBEY-FM's country format.

In January 2018, the station went silent. By way of a letter dated November 29, 2017, Adams Radio surrendered WGBG's license to the Federal Communications Commission (FCC). The FCC cancelled the station's license and deleted the WGBG call sign on February 12, 2018.

Previous logo

References

External links
FCC Station Search Details: DWGBG (Facility ID: 41484)
FCC History Cards for WGBG (covering 1958-1981 as WETT)

GBG (AM)
Radio stations established in 1960
Ocean City, Maryland
1960 establishments in Maryland
Defunct radio stations in the United States
Radio stations disestablished in 2018
2018 disestablishments in Maryland
GBG